Sopron (is a city in Hungary on the Austrian border, near Lake Neusiedl/Lake Fertő.

History

Ancient times-13th century 

When the area that is today Western Hungary was a province of the Roman Empire, a city called Scarbantia stood here. Its forum was located where the main square of Sopron can be found today.

During the Migration Period, Scarbantia was believed to be deserted. When Hungarians arrived in the area, the city was in ruins. From the 9th to the 11th centuries, Hungarians strengthened the old Roman city walls and built a castle. The city was named in Hungarian after a castle steward named Suprun. In 1153, it was mentioned as an important city.

In 1273, King Otakar II of Bohemia occupied the castle. Even though he took the children of Sopron's nobility with him as hostages, the city opened its gates when the armies of King Ladislaus IV of Hungary arrived. Ladislaus rewarded Sopron by elevating it to the rank of free royal town.

16th-19th centuries
During the Ottoman occupation of Hungary, the Ottoman Turks ravaged the city in 1529, but did not occupy it. Many Hungarians fled from the occupied areas to Sopron, and the city's importance grew.

While the Ottomans occupied most of Central Europe, the region north of Lake Balaton remained in the Kingdom of Hungary (1538–1867) (captaincy between Balaton and Drava).

In 1676, Sopron was destroyed by a fire. The modern city was born over the next few decades, when Baroque buildings were built to replace the destroyed medieval ones. Sopron became the seat of the comitatus Sopron.

The town was the seat of the Ödenburg comitat near 1850. After the compromise of 1867 and until 1918, the city (known with the dual bilingual name of 
Sopron - Ödenburg) was part of the Habsburg-ruled Kingdom of Hungary.

20th century to present

Following the breakup of the Austro-Hungarian Empire, ethnic Austrians inhabited parts of four western Hungarian counties: Pozsony (Pressburg in German; Bratislava in Czech/Slovak), Vas (Eisenburg), Sopron (Ödenburg) and Moson (Wieselburg). The Austrian-inhabited parts of those counties were initially awarded to Austria in the Treaty of Saint-Germain-en-Laye (1919). After local unrest and Italian diplomatic mediation in the Venice Protocol, Sopron's status as part of Hungary (along with that of the surrounding eight villages) was decided by a controversial, local plebiscite held on December 14, 1921, with 65% voting for Hungary. Since then Sopron has been called Civitas Fidelissima ("The Most Loyal Town"), and the anniversary of the plebiscite is a city holiday. However, the western parts of Vas, Sopron and Moson counties joined Austria and now form the Austrian federal state of Burgenland, and Pressburg/Pozsony was awarded to Czechoslovakia.

Sopron suffered greatly during World War II and was bombed several times. The Soviet Red Army captured the city on April 1, 1945. On August 19, 1989, Sopron was the site of the Pan-European Picnic, a protest on the border between Austria and Hungary, which was used by over 600 citizens of East Germany to escape to the West. As the first successful crossing of the border, it helped pave the way for the mass flight of East German citizens that led to the fall of the Berlin Wall on November 9, 1989.

During the Socialist era, the government tried to turn Sopron into an industrial city, but much of the medieval town center remains, allowing the city to remain an attractive site for tourists.

Today, Sopron's economy immensely benefits from the European Union. Having been a city close to nowhere, that is, to the Iron Curtain, Sopron now has re-established full trade relations to nearby Austria. Furthermore, after being suppressed during the Cold War, Sopron's German-speaking culture and heritage are now recognized again. As a consequence, many of the city's street-and traffic-signs are written in both Hungarian and German making it an officially bilingual city due to its proximity to the Austrian frontier. Visitors admire the large number of buildings in this city that reflect medieval architecture - rare in war-torn Hungary. Situated close to the Austrian border, Sopron receives many visitors from Vienna ( away), and from Bratislava, Slovakia ( away), as well as from the United States, Great Britain, The Netherlands, Japan, and Scandinavia, who visit to take advantage of the excellent low-cost dental services offered: Sopron boasts so many dental clinics—more than 300—that the city is known as the "dental capital of the world."

Wine production

Sopron is a significant wine producing region, one of the few in Hungary to make both red and white wines. Grapes include Kékfrankos for red wine and Traminer (Gewürztraminer) for white wine. In climate it is similar to the neighbouring Burgenland wine region in Austria, and several winemakers make wine in both countries. Blue Frankish (= Kékfrankos, Blaufränkisch), Traminer, and Green Veltliner (= Zöld Veltelini, Grüner Veltliner) are well-known Sopron wines. Sopron's Blue Frankish and Pinot Noir wines are particularly prized.

The group of ethnic German wine growers in the Sopron area in the Habsburg Monarchy were the so-called Ponzichter.

Demographics

In 1910, Sopron had 33,931 inhabitants (51% German, 44.3% Hungarian, 4.7% other). Religions: 64.1% Roman Catholic, 27.8% Lutheran, 6.6% Jewish, 1.2% Calvinist, 0.3% other. In 2001, the city had 56,125 inhabitants (92.8% Hungarian, 3.5% German, 3.7% other). Religions: 69% Roman Catholic, 7% Lutheran, 3% Calvinist, 8.1% Atheist, 11.9% no answer, 1% other.

Architecture

The architecture of the old section of town reflects its long history; walls and foundations from the Roman Empire are still common, together with a wealth of Medieval, Renaissance, and Baroque structures, often artistically decorated, showing centuries of stability and prosperity.

There is an old synagogue and other remains from the town's former Jewish community, which was expelled in the 16th century.

On Daloshegy, there is a 165-metre tall FM-/TV-broadcasting tower, nicknamed "Rakéta" (Hungarian for rocket).

Places of interest

 City centre
 Firewatch Tower
 Walls with Roman origin
 Széchenyi Square and Flag of Loyalty
 Kecske Church
 Esterházy Palace (baroque)
 Eggenberg House
 City Hall (eclectic, 1895)
 Storno House (renaissance)
 Fabricius House
 "Two Moors" House (18th century baroque)
 Chemist's Museum (15th–16th century. The house was pronounced the first national monument in Hungary by Louis II of Hungary in 1525.)
 Lábasház (16th–17th century)
 Gambrinus House (Old city hall)
 Taródi Castle (István Taródi built the castle by himself. He started the building operations in 1945, when he was 20.)

Amusement

 Cartoon Forum (From Tuesday 14 to Friday 17 September 2010)
 Spring Festival of Sopron (Soproni Tavaszi Fesztivál)
 Festal Weeks of Sopron (Soproni Ünnepi Hetek)
 VOLT festival
 Civitas Pinceszínház (Civitas Basement Theater)
 Liszt Ferenc Művelődési Központ (Franz Liszt Conference and Cultural Centre )

Politics 
The current mayor of Sopron is Ciprián Farkas (Fidesz-KDNP).

The local Municipal Assembly, elected at the 2019 local government elections, is made up of 18 members (1 Mayor, 12 Individual constituencies MEPs and 5 Compensation List MEPs) divided into this political parties and alliances:

Gallery

Sports
The women's basketball team Sopron Basket is one of the most successful Hungarian basketball team in the history with 15 National titles and they success in Europe, in 2022 they won EuroLeague. MFC Sopron was a football team based in Sopron. The successor of the club is Soproni VSE.

Notable residents

 Rogerius of Apulia (1205-1266), medieval chronicler
 Anna Maria von Eggenberg, née Brandenburg-Bayreuth (1609-1680), Margravine of Brandenburg-Bayreuth and Princess of Eggenberg 
 Dániel Berzsenyi (1776-1836), poet
 Ludwig von Benedek (1804-1881), Austrian general
 Franz Liszt (1811-1886), composer
 Franz von Suppé (1819-1895), composer
 Julius Lenck (1845 - 1901), Hungarian-German brewer, wholesaler and the founder of the Sopron Brewery (Soproni Sörgyár).
 Gyula Fényi (1845-1927), astronomer
 László Rátz (1863-1930), mathematics teacher
 Kálmán Kánya (1869-1945), politician, diplomat, Foreign Minister
 Franz Lehár (1870-1948), composer
 Béla Bartók (1881-1945), composer
 Charles I of Austria (1887-1922), last king of Hungary
 Georg Trakl (1887-1914), poet
 Mátyás Rákosi (1892-1971), politician, communist leader
 David-Zvi Pinkas (1895-1952), signatory of the Israeli declaration of independence
 Margaret Mahler (1897-1985), psychoanalyst
 Sandor Gallus (1907-1996), archaeologist
  (born 1933), Professor of MIT (Massachusetts Institute of Technology), sociologist
 Alexander Gallus (born 1940), medical researcher
 József Szájer (born 1961), politician
 István Hiller (born 1964), politician, Minister of Culture
 Mihály Tóth (born 1974), football player
 Vilmos Radasics (born 1983), BMX rider
 Tímea Babos (born 1993), tennis player
 Botond Balogh (born 2002), football player
 Balogh de Mankó Bük, Hungarian nobility
 József Rokop, freedom fighter
 Terezia Mora, writer

Twin towns – sister cities

Sopron is twinned with:

 Bad Wimpfen, Germany
 Banská Štiavnica, Slovakia
 Bolzano, Italy
 Eilat, Israel
 Eisenstadt, Austria
 Kazuno, Japan
 Kempten, Germany
 Mediaș, Romania
 Rorschach, Switzerland
 Seinäjoki, Finland
 Sparta, Greece

See also
 Daughters of the Divine Redeemer
 Jewish history of Sopron
 Lake Neusiedl

References

Notes

External links

  in Hungarian, English and German
 University of West Hungary (University of Sopron)  
 ImageTownsIndex - Virtual Tour of Sopron  
 Aerial photography: Sopron
 Accommodation in Sopron
 Sopron at funiq.hu

 
Populated places in Győr-Moson-Sopron County
Cities with county rights of Hungary
Siebengemeinden
Hungarian German communities
Wine regions of Hungary
Austria–Hungary border crossings
Roman settlements in Hungary
Pannonia Superior